Tipton Township is a township in Hardin County, Iowa, USA.

History
Tipton Township was created in 1859. It was named from Tipton Creek, and Tipton Creek was named in honor of John Tipton.

References

Townships in Hardin County, Iowa
Townships in Iowa
1859 establishments in Iowa